IV or Ima nešto u tom što me nećeš (in ) is the fourth studio album by Serbian pop singer-songwriter Željko Joksimović. The album was released on 11 December 2005 in most of countries from the former Yugoslavia. The album had a large success and some of the top singles from the album are: "Michelle", "Crnokosa" and "Ima nešto u tom što me nećeš".

Track listing

 "Ima nešto u tom što me nećeš" (Има нешто у том што ме нећеш)
 "Milo za drago" (Мило за драго)
 "Michelle" (Мишел)
 "Mila moja" (Мила моја)
 "Crnokosa" (Црнокоса)
 "Zovi me" (Зови ме)
 "Ne treba ti neko kao ja" (Не треба ти неко као ја)
 "Lutko moja" (Лутко моја)
 "Lud i ponosan" (Луд и поносан)
 "Idi na put"(Jamais) (Иди на пут)

Release history

2005 albums
Željko Joksimović albums